Pico may refer to:

Places

The Moon 
 Mons Pico, a lunar mountain in the northern part of the Mare Imbrium basin

Portugal 
 Pico, a civil parish in the municipality of Vila Verde
 Pico da Pedra, a civil parish in the municipality of Ribeira Grande, São Miguel, Azores
 Pico Island, the largest island in the Central Group of the Azores archipelago
 Mount Pico (Montanha do Pico), the distinctive stratovolcano that stands on the island of Pico
 Pico da Vara, the highest mountain on the island of São Miguel, Azores

United States 
 M. Pico Building, a building in Lafayette County, Florida
 PICO Building (Sanford, Florida)
 Camp Pico Blanco, a summer camp in Monterey County, California
 Pico Mountain, a ski resort in Rutland County, Vermont
 Pico Boulevard, a major street in Los Angeles, California
 Pico-Union, Los Angeles, a neighborhood in Los Angeles
 Pico, California, an unincorporated community now part of Pico Rivera, California

Elsewhere 
 General Pico, a city in the Province of La Pampa, Argentina
 Pico da Neblina, a mountain in the State of Amazonas, Brazil
 Pico de Orizaba, a volcano on the borders of Puebla State and Veracruz State, Mexico
 Pico do Fogo, a volcano on the island of Fogo, Cape Verde
 Pico, Lazio, a comune in the Province of Frosinone, Italy
 Pico Paraná, a mountain in the State of Paraná, Brazil
 Río Pico, Chubut, a village in the Province of Chubut, Argentina

People 
 Giovanni Pico della Mirandola (1463–1494), Italian philosopher
 Pío Pico (1801–1894), Mexican politician
 Andrés Pico (1810–1876), Mexican general
 Salomon Pico (1821–1860), Mexican soldier, Californio Bandit
 Pico Iyer (born 1957), British writer
 Jeff Pico (born 1966), American baseball player
 Sol Picó (born 1967), Spanish dancer and choreographer
 Anderson Pico (born 1988), Brazilian football player
 Pico (footballer) (born 1988), Spanish footballer
 Aaron Pico (born 1996), mixed martial artist, wrestler
 Andres G. Pico, American politician

Fictional characters 
 Pico, a character created by Tom Fulp that debuted in the Newgrounds Flash game Pico's School, also featured in Friday Night Funkin'
 Pico, a character created by American comedy duo The Jerky Boys
 Pico de Paperis, an Italian name for Ludwig Von Drake, a character in the American Walt Disney cartoon series
 Pico, the eponymous character of the hentai anime Boku no Pico

Science and medicine 
 pico-, a metric prefix denoting a factor of 10−12
 PICO dark matter experiment
 PICO process, a medical technique to frame and answer a clinical question

Computing and electronics 
 Pico (text editor), a simple text editor
 Pico (programming language), developed at Vrije Universiteit Brussel
 Pico (supercomputer), an IBM supercomputer
 Sega Pico, a video game system designed for young children
 Pico-8, a fantasy console and friendly game-making software
 Pico projector, a handheld projector
 Raspberry Pi Pico, a microcontroller

Other uses 
 Beretta Pico, a small, semi-automatic pistol manufactured in the United States by Beretta
 Laser Pico, a small sailing dinghy
 Pico de gallo, a salsa made from fresh vegetables, especially tomatoes, onions, and peppers
 PICO National Network, a U.S. religious training organization
 Island Trees School District v. Pico, a U.S. legal case
 Pico (mango), a mango cultivar from the Philippines

See also 
 Pica (disambiguation)
 Pico Agudo (disambiguation)
 Picco (disambiguation)
 Picus (disambiguation)
 Piko (disambiguation)